Queen of the Jungle is a 1935 independent film serial produced by Herman Wohl and released theatrically by Screen Attractions.

Plot
David Worth travels into Africa to find his old friend Joan Lawrence, who disappeared in a hot air balloon as a child while the pair were with an expedition searching for radium deposits.  Unknown to David, she was discovered by an African tribe and became their queen.

Cast
 Reed Howes as David Worth
 Mary Kornman as Joan Lawrence
 Marilyn Spinner as Joan Lawrence (as a child)
 Dickie Jones as David Worth (as a child)
 William J. Wals as John Lawrence
 Lafe McKee as Kali
 Eddie Foster as Rocco

Production
Most of the action footage in this serial came from the 1922 silent serial The Jungle Goddess, a co-production by William N. Selig Productions and Warner Bros., for financial reasons, and the same script was used, with the principal actors in the new scenes made up and costumed on indoor jungle mockups to match the old outdoor footage. Nonetheless, considering the changes in filming and dramatic technique that have taken place over 13 years, plus the fact that silent films were projected at a different speed than sound films, this resulted in several continuity errors.

Release

Theatrical
Screen Attractions released Queen of the Jungle in 1935 as both a 12-chapter serial and a 65-min feature film.

The film was given an international release, being released in Brazil under the title A Rainha do Sertão ("Queen of the Sertão").

Chapter titles
 Lost in the Clouds
 Radium Rays
 The Hand of Death
 The Natives' Revenge
 Black Magic
 The Death Vine
 The Leopard Leaps
 The Doom Ship
 Death Rides the Wave
 The Temple of Mu
 Fangs in the Dark
 The Pit of the Lions
Source:

See also
 List of film serials by year
 List of film serials by studio

References

External links

1935 films
1935 adventure films
American black-and-white films
1930s English-language films
Film serials
American independent films
Films directed by Robert F. Hill
Jungle girls
Films set in Africa
American adventure films
1930s independent films
1930s American films